The Wales Women's National Sevens Team represents Wales in Rugby sevens.

History 
In 2006 Wales won the European Women Sevens Championship after beating England 10–7 in the final.

In 2012 they competed in round 2 of the European Women's Sevens Series which also acted as a qualifier for the 2013 Rugby World Cup Sevens. They failed to qualify after finishing in 11th place overall.

Wales finished in fifth place at the 2017 Europe Sevens Grand Prix Series and qualified for the 2018 Commonwealth Games in Australia. They defeated South Africa 19–14 in the seventh place playoff.

Squad
Squad to 2013 Rugby World Cup Sevens Final Qualifier 
 Caryl James 
 Elinor Snowsill 
 Elen Evans
 Rachel Rees 
 Jade Phillips (Knight)
 Nia Davies 
 Laurie Harries 
 Rachel Taylor
 Delyth Davies 
 Charlotte Murray 
 Sian Williams
 Rebecca De Filippo

Tournament history

Commonwealth Games record

References

Sevens
Women's national rugby sevens teams
W